Alban Hugh Harrison (30 November 1869 – 15 August 1943) was an English international footballer who played as a full back.

Career
While playing for Old Westminsters, Harrison earned two caps for the English national side in 1893. Harrison also played for Cambridge University and Corinthian, captaining the former.

References

External links

1869 births
1943 deaths
People from the Borough of Maidstone
English footballers
England international footballers
Alumni of the University of Cambridge
Corinthian F.C. players
Cambridge University A.F.C. players
Old Westminsters F.C. players
Association football fullbacks